Pitcairnia alborubra is a species of flowering plant in the family Bromeliaceae, native to Colombia and Ecuador. It was first described by John Gilbert Baker in 1889.

References

alborubra
Flora of Colombia
Flora of Ecuador
Plants described in 1889